Aimee Baruah is an Indian actress, producer, and director.

Aimee Baruah is a National Film Award  winning actor-director whose directorial debut, the Dimasa language film "Semkhor,"" not only garnered rave reviews and critical acclaim domestically and abroad but was also honoured with two National Awards at the 68th National Film Awards. She also became the first actress from Assam to walk down the red carpet at the 75th Cannes Film Festival. Her latest documentary film, "Screaming Butterflies," has been bestowed with the prestigious "Silver Conch" award at the 17th Mumbai International Film Festival (MIFF). She has also been a jury member at several prestigious film festivals in India and internationally, including the 53rd International Film Festival of India (IFFI) held in Goa.

Since starting her career at the tender age of fourteen, she has starred in over twenty-nine feature-length films, including several National Award-winning projects. She firmly believes that films are a potent tool to share untold stories from North East India. She also holds a Masters Degree in Sociology and is a gold medalist in Economics. She is currently pursuing her PhD from Guwahati University on the films of legendary singer, musician, and filmmaker Dr. Bhupen Hazarika.

Personal life 
Baruah was born in Nagaon to Mala Baruah and Purna Baruah, a police superintendent. Aimee Baruah married Bharatiya Janta Party (BJP) politician and Minister Pijush Hazarika on 1 October 2011.

Filmography

As an actress

As director

Awards

Controversy 

 In order to protest the misrepresentation of their community in the National Award-winning movie Semkhor, Dimasa organizations in the capital of Assam's Dima Hasao district, have petitioned President Droupadi Murmu to step in and stop the film's screening.
 The director of the 2021 Dimasa-language film Semkhor, is currently facing legal issues. The ex-President of the All Dimasa Students' Union Mohendra Kemprai filed an FIR against her for allegedly "misrepresenting" Dimasa culture and fostering misconceptions about the tribe which portrays a barbaric image of India in front of the world.
 The organizations claimed that an 84-day-old infant died after four days following the shooting of the movie Semkhor due to extreme exposure to cold and the grave negligence of Baruah."
 The Assamese film fraternity believes that her career graph took a sharp turn upwards after her husband became a Minister in the BJP Govt of Assam.

References

External links 

Living people
People from Nagaon district
Actresses from Assam
Indian film actresses
Actresses in Assamese cinema
Assamese-language film directors
Year of birth missing (living people)
21st-century Indian actresses